Rochford and Southend East is a constituency represented in the House of Commons of the UK Parliament since 2005 by Sir James Duddridge, a Conservative.

History 
This seat was created for the 1997 general election primarily from the abolished constituency of Borough Constituency of Southend East, with the addition of Rochford and Great Wakering, which were previously in the abolished County Constituency of Rochford.

It has been held by the Conservatives since its formation.

Boundaries

1997–2010: The Borough of Southend-on-Sea wards of Milton, St Luke's, Shoebury, Southchurch, Thorpe, and Victoria, and the District of Rochford wards of Barling and Sutton, Foulness and Great Wakering East, Great Wakering Central, Great Wakering West, Rochford Eastwood, Rochford Roche, and Rochford St Andrews.

2010–present: The Borough of Southend-on-Sea wards of Kursaal, Milton, St Luke's, Shoeburyness, Southchurch, Thorpe, Victoria, and West Shoebury, and the District of Rochford wards of Barling and Sutton, Foulness and Great Wakering, and Rochford.

Marginal changes due to redistribution of local authority wards.

The constituency covers the town of Rochford and the town centre, main seafront and eastern part of Southend-on-Sea, such as Thorpe Bay and Shoeburyness.

Constituency profile
Rochford and Southend East had a relatively marginal Conservative majority on its 1997 creation, as it had some of Labour's stronger wards in Southend, such as Kursaal, Milton, St. Luke's and Victoria, with the party nearly gaining its predecessor seat Southend East in a by-election in 1980, though in the elections since a much larger majority suggests a Conservative safe seat. In more recent elections, it had become more marginal however than other Essex constituencies that elected Labour MPs in the 21st century such as Harlow and Basildon.

Dependency on social housing and unemployment benefit in the constituency is low and in the Rochford local council only 14.5% of households do not have a car (band 5 of 5 in the 2011 census) whereas 27% of households in the Southend part lack a car (band 2 of 5).

The 2017 election saw a 5% swing to Labour, cutting Duddridge's majority by 3,928 votes. In the 2019 election however, a 7.4% swing from Labour to the Conservatives gave Duddridge a 12,286 majority; his largest ever majority under the seat's current boundaries.

Local government

Currently the 31 Council seats held in Rochford and Southend East are 7 Conservative (from Rochford), 10 Independent, 7 Labour, 5 Conservative and 2 UKIP (from Southend).

Members of Parliament

Elections

Elections in the 2010s

Elections in the 2000s

Elections in the 1990s

See also
 List of parliamentary constituencies in Essex

Notes

References

Parliamentary constituencies in Essex
Constituencies of the Parliament of the United Kingdom established in 1997
Politics of Southend-on-Sea